Norway Lake is a lake in the Moira River and Lake Ontario drainage basins in Addington Highlands, Lennox and Addington County, Ontario, Canada.

The primary outflow, at the southwest, is an unnamed creek to Rainy Lake, whose waters flow via Rainy Creek, Partridge Creek, the Skootamatta River and the Moira River into the Bay of Quinte on Lake Ontario at Belleville.

See also
List of lakes in Ontario

References

Lakes of Lennox and Addington County